Delamarentulus tristani is a species of proturan in the family Acerentomidae. It is found in Africa, the Caribbean Sea, Central America, and South America.

References

Further reading

 

Protura
Articles created by Qbugbot
Animals described in 1938